Veillette and Veillet may refer to:

Surnames 
 Alfred Veillet (1882–1958), a French painter
 Christian Veillet (born 1954), a French astronomer
 Doris Veillette (1935–2019), a Quebec journalist and feminist
 Georges W. Veillette (1918-1993), renowned businessman in the mattress industry in Saint-Narcisse, Canada
 Guillaume Veillet (born 1975), French researcher in ethnomusicology and music journalist
 Jean Veillet (1664–1741), French and Canadian ancestor of all the Veillet/te(s) of America
 Jean Veillet (1901–1985), a French doctor part of the French Resistance in WWII, mayor of Dijon, and president of the general council of Côte-d'Or, France
 Jean-Baptiste Veillet-Dufrêche (1838–1892), a French politician
 Jeffrey Veillet (1881–1946), businessman and mayor in Sainte-Thècle, Quebec, Canada
 Joe Veillette (born 1946), American luthier and musician
 Martin Veillette (born 1936), Quebec (Canada) theologian, philosopher, sociologist, and teacher
 Michel Veillette (born 1939), Canadian politician in Quebec
 Omer Veillette (1896-1970), founding president of Veillette Transport and mayor of La Tuque, Quebec, Canada

Toponyms 
 Centre des loisirs Michel-Veillette, a recreational center in Pointe-du-Lac, Trois-Rivières, Quebec, Canada
 Calvaire de la Rivière-à-Veillet, a crucifix shrine in Sainte-Geneviève-de-Batiscan, in Mauricie, Quebec, Canada
 Parc René-Veillet, in the district of Greenfield Park, Longueuil, Quebec, Canada
 Parc Roland-Veillet, in Val-d'Or, Abitibi, Quebec, Canada
 Lake Veillette, in Lac-aux-Sables, in Mauricie, Quebec, Canada
 Veillet River (French: Rivière à Veillet), in Sainte-Geneviève-de-Batiscan, Mauricie, Quebec, Canada

Other uses
 Association des Veillet/te d'Amérique (Veillette Family Association of America), a non-profit organization established in 1986 dedicated to historical and genealogical research
 16984 Veillet, an asteroid of the asteroid belt between Mars and Jupiter
 Hôtel Veillet-Dufrêche, a mansion located at Moncontour (Côtes-d'Armor), in the department of Côtes-d'Armor, in France